Areliz Benel Bolaños (born 28 October 1988) is a Peruvian actress, best known for her role as Shirley Gonzales in the TV series Al Fondo Hay Sitio.

Benel was born in Lima.  Since 2008 she has been studying at the Escuela Nacional Superior de Arte Dramático. She also studying at the Instituto Peruano de Publicidad.

In 2012, she competed in dance reality show El Gran Show.

Filmography

References

External links

21st-century Peruvian actresses
Living people
1988 births
Actresses from Lima
Peruvian television actresses